Pribylovo is the name of several rural localities in Russia:
Pribylovo, Leningrad Oblast, a settlement in Primorskoye Settlement Municipal Formation of Vyborgsky District in Leningrad Oblast; 
 Pribylovo (air base), nearby Russian Air Force airbase
Pribylovo, Yaroslavl Oblast, a village in Bolsheselsky Rural Okrug of Bolsheselsky District in Yaroslavl Oblast